Red Chinese Battle Plan is a 28-minute black-and-white propaganda short produced by the United States Department of Defense in 1967. Presented as a documentary film on Chinese history to military servicemen, the propaganda short describes the People's Republic of China as plotting to "conquer and enslave" the world.

Overview
Produced five years before the beginning of the United States' rapprochement with Mao Zedong in 1972, Red Chinese Battle Plan was made during the Vietnam War under the Lyndon Johnson administration. Despite the widening rift between the China and the Soviet Union, both powers supported the Vietnamese communists during the Indochina conflict, while the Western Bloc cultivated a myth of Chinese expansionism throughout the decade.

The film traces the political philosophy of Mao Zedong to the time of the building of the Great Wall, a period described in the film as an era of "slave labor and thought control." The film's anonymous narrator accuses the People's Republic of China of trying to "conquer and enslave" the planet.

Footnotes

See also
List of American films of 1967

References

External links
 

1967 films
1967 documentary films
American anti-communist propaganda shorts
China–United States military relations
American propaganda during the Cold War
Documentary films about China
1960s English-language films
1960s American films